]
Iryna Mykhailivna Akimova (born on April 26, 1960, in Kharkiv, Soviet Union) is a Ukrainian politician and former First Deputy Head of Presidential Administration of Ukraine She held this post from February 2010 till February 2014.

Biography 
Akimova was born in Kharkiv on 26 April 1960. In 1982, she graduated from the Economics Faculty of the Kharkiv State University. She was the holder of Alexander von Humboldt Foundation, Volkswagen Stiftung, DAAD, and ACCEL fellowships.

After April 2014, she moved away from politics and is engaged in painting in Kyiv. In January 2022, she opened an exhibition showing her paintings, painted since 2017.

Work and scientific activities 
In the middle of the 1980s, Akimova passed her Ph.D. defense.

Positions and places of work 

 senior advisor to Victor Yanukovych and his government on devising non-working reforms, which misled Ukrainian people and international organisations and allowed the regime to continue.
 director of the Institute for Economic Research and Policy Consulting in Kyiv.
 senior research fellow at the Center for Economic Research at Warsaw University.
 research assistant at the Economics department of the University of Magdeburg.
 director of the analytical center "Blakitna strіchka" Ltd. (Blue Ribbon).
 Assistant Professor of Management Department at Kharkiv Polytechnic Institute.
 Director General of the analytical center "Bureau of Economic and Social Technologies" (Kyiv) – at the time of elections in 2007.

Political career 
Since October 2007 Akimova has been a member of the Party of Regions. In November 2007 she was elected the Member of Parliament – No. 63 on the list. Akimova then worked as Deputy Head of the Committee in Verkhovna Rada on economic policy issues and took the position of Economy Minister in the opposition government of Viktor Yanukovych. Akimova is a frequent guest at political talk shows and is the public figure in the Party of Regions.

On February 25, 2010, Akimova was appointed the First Deputy Head of Presidential Administration. On March 16, 2010, she was appointed the Representative of the President of Ukraine in the Cabinet of Ministers of Ukraine.

After Andriy Klyuyev had left the post in mid-February 2012 Akimova was tipped as the new First Vice Prime Minister of Ukraine.
But Valeriy Khoroshkovskyi was appointed instead.

In October 2012 Akimova was re-elected into the Ukrainian parliament on the party list of the Party of Regions, but she turned down this mandate.

In late January 2014, by decrees of President Yanukovych Akimova was dismissed from the post of first deputy head of the Presidential Administration and appointed advisor to the President. In February 2014 Yanukovych was ousted from power. In an April 2014 interview, she stated that she no longer is a member of the Party of Regions.

See also 
 Party of Regions
 Verkhovna Rada
 List of Ukrainian Parliament Members 2007
 2007 Ukrainian parliamentary election

References

1960 births
Living people
Politicians from Kharkiv
Sixth convocation members of the Verkhovna Rada
Party of Regions politicians
National University of Kharkiv alumni
Academic staff of Kharkiv Polytechnic Institute
21st-century Ukrainian politicians
21st-century Ukrainian women politicians
Women members of the Verkhovna Rada